Zina Garrison defeated Rene Uys in the final, 6–4, 3–6, 6–0 to win the girls' singles tennis title at the 1981 Wimbledon Championships.

Seeds

  Bonnie Gadusek (third round)
  Elizabeth Sayers (semifinals)
  Anne Minter (quarterfinals)
  Helena Suková (second round)
  Corinne Vanier (third round)
  Andrea Temesvári (quarterfinals)
 n/a
  Zina Garrison (champion)

Draw

Finals

Top half

Section 1

Section 2

Bottom half

Section 3

Section 4

References

External links

Girls' Singles
Wimbledon Championship by year – Girls' singles